An Evening with Wild Man Fischer is a 1969 double LP album by Wild Man Fischer.  It was produced by Frank Zappa and released on his Bizarre record label.

The album is split into four different areas on each record side for the type of song they contain. Some of side one had audio clips of live street performances where he would ask passerby to hear a song for a dime with percussion noises from Art Tripp added in. Side two is a collection of A cappella songs from Larry, with him also occasionally using a guitar to strum or use as percussion. Side three is filled with Fischer's first songs, and his stories of making them, as well as more street performances with Art's percussion. The final side includes a "psychedelic" rock song called Circles, and The Wild Man Fischer Story, which had Fischer sing about his home life by year. The song "Merry Go Round" as well as Fischer's remark of "You call that doing your thing?" during "New Kind of Songs for Sale" were referenced in the spoken dialogue segments of both Zappa's Lumpy Gravy and Civilization Phase III.

The copyright is owned by the estate of Frank Zappa, whose widow Gail had refused to release it on compact disc. 
After Gail's death, the album was finally issued on a double CD in 2016 on the Gonzo Multimedia label. This CD version was copied from a vinyl LP.

A second CD edition was issued in 2020 by the Japanese label Wasabi Records. This release, unlike the Gonzo Multimedia edition, credits Herb Cohen as the master owner and reproduces the original Bizarre Records labels on the faces of the CD.

Track listing (including explanatory notes)

Personnel
 Larry Fischer - vocals, electric guitar (on "Larry & His Guitar")
 Frank Zappa - Guitar on "The Taster" (Fancy version), all instruments on "Circle", production
 The Mothers of Invention - piano, bass & drums (on "The Taster (fancy version)")
 Art Tripp - percussion (Side One)
 Kim Fowley - recitation ("The Madness & Ecstasy")
 Rodney Bingenheimer - recitation ("The Madness & Ecstasy")
 The GTOs - recitation ("The Madness & Ecstasy")

References

1968 debut albums
Bizarre Records albums
Wild Man Fischer albums
Albums produced by Frank Zappa
Albums recorded at Sunset Sound Recorders
Reprise Records albums